Amorphus globosus (from Greek: αμορφή (amorphē) 'formless' and Latin: globus 'sphere') is a malformation occurring in veterinary medicine, especially in domestic cattle. Instead of a normally developed fetus, it results in the formation of a more or less spherical structure covered with hairy skin, which contains parts of all three germ layers; the differentiation of its contents can vary greatly. An amorphus globosus is not viable due to the lack of functional organs.

Origin 
The teratological reasons for the development of amorphus globosus are not fully understood, but it is believed that The malformation is generally associated with twin gestation, in which one embryo does not develop normally. In two cases, the karyotype of the amorphus was identical to its normally developing twin, while in another case, the karotype deviated from the normal twin, so that an emergence from fraternal twins also seems possible.

Distribution 
Amorphus globosus is more common in livestock than generally assumed. It occurs most commonly in cattle, but there are also case reports in goats and horses. A case of Amorphus globosus has also been described in human medicine, where it was also a twin pregnancy.

References

External links 

 Image of an Amorphus globosus in cattle on website of Cornell University

Animal developmental biology
Livestock
Cattle
Veterinary medicine